Oddr Snorrason whose name is also sometimes Anglicized as Odd Snorrason was a 12th-century Icelandic Benedictine monk at the Þingeyraklaustur monastery (Þingeyrarklaustur). The monastery was founded in 1133 and was the first in Iceland.

Work
One latin version of the Óláfs saga Tryggvasonar is attributed to Oddr - the original work has been almost completely lost but a translation into Old Norse is preserved in two nearly complete versions and a fragment of a third. Oddr made use of previous written works including those of Sæmundr fróði and Ari Þorgilsson as well as Acta sanctorum in Selio and possibly Historia de Antiquitate Regum Norwagiensium. In turn Snorri Sturluson made use of Oddr's work when writing the Heimskringla, as did the author of Óláfs saga Tryggvasonar en mesta.

Yngvars saga víðförla also credits Oddr with its original authorship. Scholars have been skeptical towards this claim but in recent years it has gained more acceptance.

References

Sources
 Hoops, Johannes (2003). Reallexikon der germanischen Altertumskunde: Band 22. Walter de Gruyter.  
 Oddr Snorrason (translated by Theodore M. Andersson) (2003). The Saga of Olaf Tryggvason. Cornell University Press.  
 Ross, Margaret Clunies (2000). Old Icelandic Literature and Society. Cambridge University Press.

External links
Det Arnamagnæanske Haandskrift 310 qvarto. An 1895 edition of one of the Old Norse versions
Saga Olafs konungs Tryggvasonar An 1853 edition of the other two Old Norse versions

Óláfs saga Tryggvasonar 

Manuscripts
 AM 310 4to
 Stock. Perg. 4to no. 18
 Uppsala University Library, DG 4-7

Editions 
 
 
 
 
 

Translation 
 

Icelandic writers
Icelandic Benedictines